The 4th constituency of the Côte-d'Or is a French legislative constituency in the Côte-d'Or département. Like the other 576 French constituencies, it elects one MP using the two-round system.

Description

Côte-d'Or's 4th constituency is a large rural seat covering the north of the department. Historically it has supported the non-Gaullist conservative Union for French Democracy. In 2007 when the UDF split its existing representative François Sauvadet joined the newly formed New Centre in preference to the more centrist Democratic Movement (France).

Historic Representation

Election results

2022 

 
 
|-
| colspan="8" bgcolor="#E9E9E9"|
|-
 
 

 
 
 
 
 

* Porte ran as a dissident Horizons member, without the support of the party or the Ensemble alliance.

2017

2012

References

4